The Big Church Festival, formally known as Big Church Day Out, or BCDO, is a Christian non-profit music festival that takes place in Wiston, West Sussex, England, best known for its contemporary Christian music. A number of musical genres are represented at the festival including Christian Rock, Contemporary Worship Music, Gospel and Christian Rap.

The festival started as just one day in 2009 matching the festival name ‘Big Church Day Out’ but was extended from one day to three days in 2010 in Sussex, with an additional day in the Midlands version of the festival. 2009 had 15,000 attendees and increased in 2010 with 25,000 attendees. 

In 2011, the length of the festival was reduced to two days and the number attending decreased to 20,000. Since 2012 attendances have returned in excess of 25,000 people each year at the BCDO South festival in West Sussex.  

After two cancelled years due to the Covid-19 pandemic, the festival returned in 2022 under the updated name 'Big Church Festival', with an expanded site, and with attendance rising to around 40,000.

The Big Church Day Out was created by Tim Jupp, a founding member of Delirious?.

Lineups 

Artists who have previously appeared at the event include rock bands such as YFriday, for KING & COUNTRY, Switchfoot, Casting Crowns, Newsboys, Delirious?, Jesus Culture, BOSH, Rend Collective, Matt Redman, Martin Smith, LZ7, Lecrae, The Abrams, Mica Paris, Pat Barrett, Joshua Luke Smith, Elle Limebear, Jeremy Camp, Dance Like Kings and many more.

References

Christian music festivals